John Tierney may refer to:

Politicians
John Tierney (Australian politician) (born 1946), Liberal member of the Australian Senate
John Tierney (Irish politician) (born 1951)
John F. Tierney (born 1951), United States Representative from Massachusetts
John H. Tierney (1831-1907), American farmer and politician
John J. Tierney (19??-2005), Boston City Council member

Sportsmen
John Tierney (footballer), player for Cork City Football Club
John Tierney (Gaelic footballer) (born 1982), Gaelic footballer
John Tierney (rower), American rower
John Tierney (cricketer) (born 1964), English cricketer

Others
John Tierney (journalist) (born 1953), American journalist
John Tierney (film editor), known for his editing work on Sesame Street
John M. Tierney, United States naval aviator and finalist for NASA Astronaut Group 1